Natureland Seal Sanctuary, also referred to as Skegness Natureland or Skegness Seal Sanctuary is an animal attraction in Skegness, Lincolnshire, England.

Attractions
Natureland is a seal sanctuary, with a seal hospital, a small zoo, tropical glasshouses (known as the 'Floral Palace') and an aquarium. Animals include seals, African penguins, crocodiles, goats, tarantulas, snakes, terrapins, scorpions, as well as tropical butterflies and birds. Glasshouses contain many exotic plants, including cacti from the US, Mediterranean shrubs and banana plants.

In the seal hospital, orphaned seal pups are reared before eventually being released back into the wild. 30-60 seals are rescued by Natureland each winter. In April 2018 Natureland rescued their 800th seal.

The seals are trained to perform some simple tricks at feeding times, which some visitors might object to, from an ethical standpoint.

Facilities at the centre include a cafe/restaurant, gift shop, customer toilets and a small area for children to try their hand at activities including brass rubbing.

It is situated on North Parade, next to the beach, and open every day except Christmas Day, Boxing Day and New Years Day. There is a fee for entry.

History

Before Natureland was opened there were butterfly houses, known even then as the 'Floral Palace', an aquarium and a gift shop at the site, which was run by an investment company based in Manchester.

Natureland was founded in 1965 by John Yeadon, when it was opened by Princess Margaret and the attraction is still run by Yeadon's family.

In 1966/67 Natureland featured in the BBC children's television programme Blue Peter and was visited by John Noakes.

In 1981 Natureland rescued a walrus, which they named 'Wally', which had strayed from the animals' usual Arctic range. It is rare for walruses to visit the United Kingdom and then they are usually only seen around the Scottish islands.

In 2012 Natureland rescued a rare hooded seal, which had travelled to Lincolnshire all the way from Greenland.

In 2015 a television series about the attraction ran on Estuary TV. and in 2017 BBC One ran a feature about Natureland on a programme called Countryfile Winter Diaries.

See also
 Donna Nook
 Grey seal
 Mablethorpe Seal Sanctuary and Wildlife Centre
 Cornish Seal Sanctuary
 List of animal sanctuaries

References

External links
 
 Natureland Seal Sanctuary Review

Zoos in England
Aquaria in England
Seal sanctuaries
Organisations based in Lincolnshire
Skegness
Zoos established in 1965
1965 establishments in England
Tourist attractions in Lincolnshire